News from the Mystic Auricle is an album by American jazz trombonist Steve Swell, which was recorded in 2007 and released on the Polish Not Two label. He presents a new band called Rivers of Sound Ensemble, extending Slammin' the Infinite with trumpeter Roy Campbell and Hilliard Greene instead of Matthew Heyner on bass.

Reception
The All About Jazz review by Jeff Stockton notes that "With the horns coming together and cleaving apart in a continuous seamless flow and Greene's strings squealing under his bow, it's Klaus Kugel's tireless drumming that tethers Campbell, Swell and Mateen to the ground." In another review for All About Jazz John Sharpe states "These guys are masters of this art and close listening reveals a wealth of incidental detail, particularly from the rhythmic axis of Kugel and Greene, which illuminates this highly recommended outing."

Track listing
All compositions by Campbell / Mateen / Swell / Greene / Kugel
"Journey to Omphalos" - 27:13
"Healix" - 19:35 
"News From the Mystic Auricle" - 22:51

Personnel
Roy Campbell - trumpet, flugelhorn
Sabir Mateen - alto sax, tenor sax, clarinet, flute
Steve Swell - trombone
Hilliard Greene - bass
Klaus Kugel  - drums

References

2008 albums
Steve Swell albums